Powerslide may refer to: 
Powerslide driving, a throttle-on induced oversteer. Initiating a drift (oversteer) by applying the throttle in a turn enough to make the rear wheels break traction and slide out
Powerslide, a braking technique used in inline skating
Powerslide (video game) (aka PowerSlide), a racing game by Ratbag Games